DDB1 and CUL4 associated factor 17 is a protein that in humans is encoded buy the DCAF17 gene.

Function 

DCAF17 is a nuclear transmembrane protein that associates with cullin 4A / damaged DNA binding protein 1 ubiquitin ligase complex.

Clinical significance 

Mutations in this gene are associated with Woodhouse–Sakati syndrome.

References

Further reading